Phaeanthus ophthalmicus (synonym Polyalthia macropoda) is a species of plant in the family Annonaceae and tribe Miliuseae. It is a tree found in Peninsular Malaysia and Singapore.

References

macropoda
Trees of Malaya
Least concern plants
Taxonomy articles created by Polbot